Trond Viggo Toresen (born 22 February 1978) is a Norwegian football midfielder who currently plays for Verdal.

He joined the team from Levanger in 2011. Before he went back to his home towns of Verdal and Levanger he played in Norwegian Tippeliga and Adeccoliga for Odd Grenland and Notodden as a midfielder. He was a regular midfielder on the Odd team which played in Tippeligaen.

References

Altomfotball.no

1978 births
Living people
People from Levanger
People from Verdal
Norwegian footballers
Byåsen Toppfotball players
Pors Grenland players
Odds BK players
Notodden FK players
Levanger FK players
Norwegian First Division players
Eliteserien players
Association football midfielders
Sportspeople from Trøndelag